During the 1985-1986 season A.C. Fiorentina competed in Serie A and Coppa Italia.

Summary 
The club appointed Aldo Agroppi as its manager for the campaign, reaching the 5th spot in League; Most of the points were clinched at Comunale. The squad could defeat the Big Three: Milan, Inter and Juventus during the season.

Owing to injuries new acquisition (€1.39 million paid to Vicenza) youngster playmaker Roberto Baggio could not play in Serie A being called for the bench for only three times and, during May played only five matches in Coppa Italia. Other new arrivals to the club were: midfielder Nicola Berti, Sergio Battistini, Maurizio Iorio, Aldo Maldera, Onorati, Gelsi and Labardi.

During April Dutch forward Marco van Basten from Ajax signed with the team a three-year-agreement (until 1989), however, the transfer in was not completed due to the arrival of a new chairman Piercesare Baretti who did not give the green light to the contract.

Meanwhile in Coppa Italia the squad reached the Semifinals stage being defeated by future Champion A.S. Roma after two legs. Argentine Defender Daniel Passarella was the season topscorer with 15 goals.

After six years, Chairman Ranieri Pontello left the club during June.

Squad

Competitions

Serie A

League table

Results by round

Matches

Coppa Italia

Group stage

Group 1

Eightfinals

Quarterfinals

Semifinals

Statistics

Squad statistics

Players statistics

References

External links 
 

ACF Fiorentina seasons
Fiorentina